The O'Brien dynasty (genitive Uí Bhriain ) is a noble house of Munster, founded in the 10th century by Brian Boru of the Dál gCais (Dalcassians). After becoming King of Munster, through conquest he established himself as Ard Rí na hÉireann (High King of Ireland). Brian's descendants thus carried the name Ó Briain, continuing to rule the Kingdom of Munster until the 12th century where their territory had shrunk to the Kingdom of Thomond which they would hold for just under five centuries.

In total, four Ó Briains ruled in Munster, and two held the High Kingship of Ireland (with opposition). After the partition of Munster into Thomond and the MacCarthy Kingdom of Desmond by Tairrdelbach Ua Conchobair in the 12th century, the dynasty would go on to provide around thirty monarchs of Thomond until 1542.

During part of this period in the late 13th century they had a rivalry with the Norman de Clare house, disputing the throne of Thomond. The last Ó Briain to reign in Thomond was Murrough Ó Briain who surrendered his sovereignty to the new Kingdom of Ireland under Henry VIII of the House of Tudor, becoming instead Earl of Thomond and maintaining a role in governance.

Throughout the time that the Ó Briains ruled in medieval Ireland, the system of tanistry was used to decide succession, rather than primogeniture used by much of feudal Europe. The system in effect was a dynastic monarchy but family-elected and aristocratic, in the sense that the royal family chose the most suitable male candidate from close paternal relations—roydammna (those of kingly material) rather than the crown automatically passing to the eldest son. This sometimes led to bitter quarrels and in-family warring. Since 1542, as a part of the Peerage of Ireland, the head of the Ó Briain house adopted primogeniture to decide succession of noble titles instead.

Naming conventions

Background
The Ó Brian emerged as chiefs of the Dál gCais tribe from the south-west of Ireland — a cohesive set of septs, related by blood, all claiming descent in tradition from a common ancestor of Cas, sixth in descent from Cormac Cas. In the Annals of the Four Masters, the father of Cormac Cas was said to be Oilioll Olum, who was according to tradition King of Munster and King of Leinster in the 3rd century. Such a connection would have meant that the tribe held kinship with the Eoghanachta who had dominated Munster since the earliest times. While founder mythologies were very common in antiquity and the medieval world, such a connection is generally regarded as fanciful and politically motivated in the context of the rise to prominence of the Dalcassians.

Instead, academic histories generally accept the Dalcassians as being the Déisi Tuaisceart, after adopting a new name — first recorded under their newly adopted name under the year 934 in the Annals of Inisfallen. The Déisi, a people whose name means literally vassals, were originally located where today is Waterford, south Tipperary and Limerick; the O'Rahilly's historical model counts them as ethnically Érainn.

The sept split into the Déisi Muman who continued to hold territory in Waterford and Tipperary, while the west Déisi controlled areas either side of the River Shannon. During the 8th century, the latter was further divided into the Déisi Deiscirt and the Déisi Tuaisceart who would become the Dalcassians. Prehistoric ancestors of the Déisi Tuisceart and Dál gCais may have been a once prominent Érainn people called the Mairtine.

It was during this century that the tribe annexed to Munster the area today known as Clare and made it their home. Taken from the weakened Uí Fiachrach Aidhne it had previously been part of Connacht but was renamed Thomond (Tuamhain, meaning North Munster). After gaining influence over other tribes in the area such as the Corcu Mruad and Corcu Baiscinn, the Dalcassians were able to crown Cennétig mac Lorcáin as King of Thomond, he died in 951. His son Mathgamain mac Cennétig was to expand their territory further according to the Annals of Ulster; capturing the Rock of Cashel capital of the Eoghanachta, the Dalcassians became Kings of Cashel and Munster over their previous overlords for the first time in history.

Mathgamain along with his younger brother Brian Boru began military campaigns such as the Battle of Sulcoit, against the Norse Vikings of the settlement Limerick, ruled by Ivar. The Dalcassians were successful, plundering spoils of jewels, gold and silver, saddles, finding "soft, youthful, bright girls, booming silk-clad women and active well-formed boys". The males fit for war were executed at Saingel, while the rest were taken as slaves.

Through much of his reign Mathgamain was competing with his Eoghanachta rival Máel Muad mac Brain. Mathgamain was only defeated in the end by a piece of treachery; he believed he was attending a friendly meeting, but was betrayed at Donnubán mac Cathail's house, handed over to his enemies and executed in 976.  The crown of Munster was briefly back in the hands of the Eoghanachta for two years until Brian Boru had thoroughly avenged his brother, with the defeat and slaying of Máel Muad in the Battle of Belach Lechta.

Rise of Brian Boru

The following year Brian came to blows with the Norsemen of Limerick at Scattery Island where a monastery was located. Whilst all parties were Christians, when their king Ivar and his sons took refuge in the monastery, Brian desecrated it and killed them in the sanctuary; the Vikings of Limerick had earlier killed Brian's mother.

Following this the Dalcassians came into conflict with those responsible for the death of Mathgamain, the Eoghanachta represented by Donovan and Molloy. A message was sent to Molloy, where Boru's son Murrough would challenge him in single combat; eventually the Battle of Belach Lechta took place where Molloy along with 1200 of his soldiers were slain. Donovan was destroyed together with Aralt, his brother-in-law and Ivar's remaining son, newly elected king of the Danes and Foreigners of Munster, in Donovan's fortress of Cathair Cuan, which Brian razed. With this Brian Boru was now the King of Munster.

Brian's rise did not go unnoticed, however; Máel Sechnaill II from the Clann Cholmáin sept of the Uí Néill, as reigning king of Mide and High King of Ireland marched an army down to Munster to send a warning to the Dalcassians. His army cut down the tree of Magh Adhair, which was sacred to the Dalcassians as it was used as their site of royal inaugurations. This sparked a conflict between Máel Sechnaill and Brian, the object of both men to be recognised as High King.

A treaty would eventually be reached between Máel Sechnaill and Brian which split the areas of influence in Ireland between them. Brian gained control over a large portion of the island's south including Dublin. The peace didn't last long as Brian used the newly acquired forces of Dublin and Leinster to spearhead an attack against Máel Sechnaill which ended in their defeat and forced Brian to reconsider pressing any further North.

The war dragged on but Brian would eventually force Máel Sechnaill to accept his authority when northern branch of the Uí Néill clan refused to support him. Despite his fall in position Máel Sechnaill would become one of Brian's most important allies. Eventually the northern Uí Néill branch would accept Brian's rule as well, unusually for the time this was done peacefully, their submission to Brian was negotiated by the clergy rather than forced in battle.

With the most powerful Kings in Ireland now accepting Brian as the High King it was a much easier task for Brian to force the remaining Kings to submit to his rule and though it may have been tenuous he eventually was acknowledged as High King by all the rulers in Ireland.

O'Brien dynasty
Brian's descendants, the Ua Briain would provide a further three High Kings of Ireland and exercised supremacy in Munster until Tairrdelbach Ua Conchobair, taking advantage of war between brothers Diarmait and former High-King Muircheartach, invaded Munster and split it in two in the Treaty of Glanmire (1118) granting Thomond to the sons of Diarmait Ua Briain and Desmond to the leading sept of the dispossessed Eoganacht, the Mac Cárthaigh dynasty. After the death of Domnall Mór Ua Briain, a claimant to the Kingship of Munster, they further retreated beyond the Shannon into the area of modern County Clare in the wake of the Norman Invasion. In 1276 King Edward II granted all of Thomond to Thomas de Clare, taking advantage of the feuding between Clann Taidhg and Clann Briain (whom de Clare supported). The de Clares failed in conquering Thomond and were decisively defeated in the Battle of Dysert O'Dea in 1318, thus the Kingdom of Thomond remained outside of foreign control for a further 200 years.

In 1543 Murchadh Carrach Ó Briain, agreed to surrender his Gaelic Royalty to King Henry VIII and accepted the titles Earl of Thomond and Baron Inchiquin. At his death in 1551 the Earldom passed to his nephew Donough by special remainder and the title Baron Inchiquin passed to his male heirs through his son Dermot. The Earldom went extinct at the death of Henry O'Brien, 8th Earl of Thomond, the next heir would have been a descendant of Daniel O'Brien, 3rd Viscount Clare who was attainded in 1691, so the title became forfeit. However, Charles O'Brien, 6th Viscount Clare, a Jacobite exile used the title Earl of Thomond, as did his son, who died childless in 1774. At the death of James O'Brien, 3rd Marquess of Thomond, the title Baron Inchiquin passed to a distant cousin and descendant of Murrough, Sir Lucius O'Brien, 5th Baronet and was passed down to his descendants.

Family Tree
Key:
= King of Dál gCais
= King of Thomond
= Baron Inchiquin
=Viscount Clare
=Earl of Thomond, Earl of Inchiquin
=Marquess of Thomond

Notes

See also 
 Irish nobility
 Irish royal families
 List of people named O'Brien

References

Footnotes

Bibliography

External links
The O'Brien Clan

 
Septs of the Dál gCais
Aibell
O'Brien
Gaels